Moithra Cuda Banda Gopallawa (16 January 1941 – 26 September 2005) (known as Monty Gopallawa) was a Sri Lankan politician. Gopallawa was the son of William Gopallawa who served as Governor-General of Ceylon and President of Sri Lanka. Gopallawa was a member of Sri Lanka's parliament. He served as deputy Minister of Labour from 1994 to 1997, deputy minister of public works from 1997 to 2000, and as cabinet minister of cultural affairs from 2000 to 2001. He lost the 2001 General Election. In 2002 he became the governor of Central Province, Sri Lanka and served in that position until his death. He died at a hospital in Colombo, Sri Lanka's capital, during treatment for an illness.

See also
List of political families in Sri Lanka
 The Gopallawa Ancestry

References

External links
 A role model for politicians
  Methek Kathawa  Divaina

1942 births
2005 deaths
Members of the 7th Parliament of Ceylon
Members of the 9th Parliament of Sri Lanka
Members of the 10th Parliament of Sri Lanka
Members of the 11th Parliament of Sri Lanka
Government ministers of Sri Lanka
Culture ministers of Sri Lanka
Governors of Central Province, Sri Lanka
Sinhalese politicians
Monty
Children of national leaders